Baron  was a Japanese bureaucrat, statesman and cabinet minister, active in Meiji period Empire of Japan.

Biography
Utsumi was born to a samurai family in Chōshū Domain, in what is now part of the city of  Yamaguchi, Yamaguchi Prefecture). As a youth, he participated in the Kinmon Incident in Kyoto, where pro-sonnō Jōi Chōshū forces sought to seize control of the Emperor to overthrow the Tokugawa shogunate.

After the Meiji Restoration, he went to Tokyo and entered into service of the new Meiji government, and was selected as a member of the 1871 Iwakura Mission, visiting the United States, Great Britain and other European countries. After his return to Japan, he was appointed governor of Nagasaki Prefecture (1877–1883), Mie Prefecture (1884–1885), Hyōgo Prefecture (1885–1889), Nagano Prefecture (1889–1891), Kanagawa Prefecture (1891–1893), Osaka Prefecture (1895–1897), and Kyoto Prefecture (1897–1900). He then served as chairman of the Board of Audit from 1900 to 1901.
  
While Utsumi was Governor of Nagasaki, he hosted former United States President Ulysses S. Grant on his visit to Japan.

Utsumi was ennobled with the kazoku peerage title danshaku (baron) in 1887. He also served as a member of the House of Peers from its inception in 1890.

Utsumi was selected to become Home Minister in the cabinet of the 1st administration of Prime Minister Katsura Tarō in 1901.

References 
 Keene, Donald. Emperor Of Japan: Meiji And His World, 1852–1912. Columbia University Press (2005). 
 Fredrick, Louis. Japan Encyclopedia. Harvard University Press (2005). 
 Sims, Richard. Japanese Political History Since the Meiji Renovation 1868-2000. Palgrave Macmillan. 

 
 

1843 births
1905 deaths
Samurai
People from Chōshū domain
Government ministers of Japan
Kazoku
People of Meiji-period Japan
Ministers of Home Affairs of Japan
Members of the House of Peers (Japan)
Governors of Nagano
Governors of Kyoto
Governors of Osaka
Governors of Kanagawa Prefecture
Members of the Iwakura Mission